Admiral Sir Leslie Derek Empson,  (29 October 1918 – 20 September 1997) was a senior officer in the Royal Navy who served as Commander-in-Chief Naval Home Command from 1974 to 1975.

Naval career
He served in the Fleet Air Arm during the Second World War.

He went on to be Flag Officer, Aircraft Carriers in 1967 and then Assistant Chief of the Naval Staff (Operations and Air) in 1968. He was made Commander-in-Chief, Far East Fleet in 1969 and Second Sea Lord and Chief of Naval Personnel in 1971. Finally he became Commander-in-Chief Naval Home Command and Flag Officer Portsmouth Area in 1974. He retired in 1975.

Later life
In retirement, Empson worked as a consultant for EMI. He also held the posts of Rear-Admiral and then Vice-Admiral of the United Kingdom.

References

|-

|-

|-

|-

1918 births
1997 deaths
People educated at Eastbourne College
Fleet Air Arm aviators
Knights Grand Cross of the Order of the British Empire
Knights Commander of the Order of the Bath
Lords of the Admiralty
Royal Navy admirals
Fleet Air Arm personnel of World War II
British World War II pilots
Military personnel from Lincolnshire